Erwin Charles Gerber (October 28, 1894 – June 3, 1978) was an American college football player and coach. He served as the head football coach at the University of Wisconsin–Eau Claire from 1925 to 1927.

References

1894 births
1978 deaths
Players of American football from Milwaukee
Sportspeople from Milwaukee
Wisconsin Badgers football players
Wisconsin–Eau Claire Blugolds football coaches
Wisconsin–La Crosse Eagles football players
Wisconsin–Eau Claire Blugolds men's basketball coaches